Space Dementia may refer to:
 "Space Dementia" (song), by Muse
 A fictional mental disorder, mentioned in several works:
 "Space Madness", a season 1 episode of the animated series The Ren and Stimpy Show
 Fragile Allegiance, a 1996 PC game
 "Joyride", a 1999 episode of the TV series The Outer Limits
 "The Train Job", an episode of the TV series Firefly
 The feature film Armageddon